Elena Nikolaeva or Yelena Nikolayeva may refer to:
 Elena Nikolaeva (journalist) (born 1985), Russian journalist
 Elena Nikolaeva (actress) (born 1983), Russian actress
 Elena Nikolaeva (poet) (1936–2011), Soviet and Russian poet and translator
 Elena Nikolaeva (politician) (born 1969), Russian politician and businesswoman
 Yelena Nikolayeva (racewalker) (born 1966), Russian racewalker 
 Elena Nikolaeva (film director) (born 1955), Russian film director